Gavazleh or Govozleh may refer to:
 Govozleh, Kurdistan
 Gavazleh, West Azerbaijan